The 2023 NBL season will be the 42nd season of the National Basketball League. For the third year in a row, the league will field 10 teams.

The regular season will commence on 6 April and contain 15 weeks followed by a four-day finals schedule in July.

Team information

Summary

Regular season standings

Finals

Awards

Performance of the Week

Statistics leaders

Regular season
 Most Valuable Player:
 Most Outstanding Guard:
 Most Outstanding NZ Guard:
 Most Outstanding Forward:
 Most Outstanding NZ Forward/Centre:
 Scoring Champion:
 Rebounding Champion:
 Assist Champion:
 Most Improved Player:
 Defensive Player of the Year:
 Youth Player of the Year:
 Coach of the Year:
 All-Star Five:
 G:
 G:
 F:
 F:
 C:

Finals
 Grand Final MVP:

References

External links
2023 schedule

National Basketball League (New Zealand) seasons
NBL